Julia Catherine Weir Aglionby,  (born 4 October 1969) is a British economist, land agent, and politician.

Having studied at Somerville College, Oxford and University College, London, Aglionby worked as an environmental economist (1993–1995) and land agent (1997–2013). She was a member of the board of Natural England between 2014 and 2019. She has been Executive Director of the Foundation for Common Land since 2012 and Professor of Practice at the University of Cumbria since 2019. She contested Carlisle for the Liberal Democrats in the 2019 General Election.

Early life and education
Aglionby was born on 4 October 1969 in London, England. She was educated at St Paul's Girls' School, a private school in London. She studied pure and applied biology at Somerville College, Oxford, graduating with a Bachelor of Arts (BA) degree: as per tradition, her BA was promoted to a Master of Arts (MA Oxon) degree. She then studied environment and natural resource economics at University College London, graduating with a Master of Science (MSc) degree. Later, she undertook research in law at the Newcastle University, graduating with a Doctor of Philosophy (PhD) degree in 2014. Her doctoral thesis was titled "The governance of commons in national parks: plurality and purpose".

References

1969 births
Living people
British economists
British women economists
Liberal Democrats (UK) parliamentary candidates
Alumni of Somerville College, Oxford
Alumni of University College London
Environmental economists
Academics of the University of Cumbria
People educated at St Paul's Girls' School
Fellows of the Royal Geographical Society